is  the former head coach of the Hitachi SunRockers.

Head coaching record

|-
| style="text-align:left;"|Daiwa Securities
| style="text-align:left;"|1994
| 16||7||9|||| style="text-align:center;"|4th in C|||-||-||-||
| style="text-align:center;"|7th
|-
| style="text-align:left;"|Daiwa Securities
| style="text-align:left;"|1995
| 16||8||8|||| style="text-align:center;"|4th in C|||-||-||-||
| style="text-align:center;"|4th
|-
| style="text-align:left;"|Daiwa Securities
| style="text-align:left;"|1996
| 16||9||7|||| style="text-align:center;"|3rd in T|||-||-||-||
| style="text-align:center;"|4th
|-
| style="text-align:left;"|Daiwa Securities
| style="text-align:left;"|1997
| 16||7||9|||| style="text-align:center;"|2nd in C|||-||-||-||
| style="text-align:center;"|3rd
|-
| style="text-align:left;"|Daiwa Securities
| style="text-align:left;"|1998
| 16||8||8|||| style="text-align:center;"|3rd in C|||-||-||-||
| style="text-align:center;"|4th
|-
| style="text-align:left;"|Hitachi SunRockers
| style="text-align:left;"|2001
| 21||2||19|||| style="text-align:center;"|8th|||-||-||-||
| style="text-align:center;"|8th
|-
| style="text-align:left;"|Hitachi SunRockers
| style="text-align:left;"|2002
| 21||8||13|||| style="text-align:center;"|7th|||-||-||-||
| style="text-align:center;"|7th
|-
| style="text-align:left;"|Hitachi SunRockers
| style="text-align:left;"|2003
| 28||11||17|||| style="text-align:center;"|7th|||-||-||-||
| style="text-align:center;"|7th
|-
| style="text-align:left;"|Hitachi SunRockers
| style="text-align:left;"|2004
| 28||8||20|||| style="text-align:center;"|8th|||-||-||-||
| style="text-align:center;"|8th
|-

References

1956 births
Living people
Japan national basketball team coaches
Niigata Albirex BB coaches
Sun Rockers Shibuya coaches